The cord is a unit of measure of dry volume used to measure firewood and pulpwood in the United States and Canada.

The name cord probably comes from the use of a cord or string to measure it.

The cord-foot was a US unit of volume for stacked firewood, four feet long, four feet wide and one foot high—equal to one eighth of a cord. Symbol for the unit was cd-ft.

Definitions 

In Canada, the cord is legally defined by Measurement Canada.  The cord is one of three legal standards for the sale of firewood in Canada:  stacked cubic metre (or stere), cubic foot, and cord.

In the United States, the cord is defined by statute in most states. The U.S. National Institute of Standards and Technology Handbook 130, section 2.4.1.2, defines a cord and provides uniform regulations for the sale of fireplace and stove wood.  In the metric system, wood is usually measured in steres and cubic metres: 1 stere = 1 m3 ≈ 0.276 cords.

Other non-official terms for firewood volume include standing cord, kitchen cord, running cord, face cord, fencing cord, country cord, long cord, and rick, all subject to local variation. These are usually taken to mean a well-stacked pile of wood in which the logs are shorter or longer than in a legal cord, to accommodate various burners. A face cord is also called a rick in Midwestern United States.

The term is used in other English-speaking countries, such as New Zealand, but may not have a legal definition.

The corde was a unit of volume used before metrication in several French-speaking countries (France, Belgium and Luxembourg). Its value varied from 6 to 13.50 m depending on the region, corresponding approximately 2 to 5 steres.

Heating value 

See also 

 Board foot
 Cubic ton
 Forest product
 Hoppus foot
 Imperial units
 List of unusual units of measurement
 Measurement Canada
 Measurement Information Division of Industry Canada
 Standard (timber unit) 
 Units of measurement

References

External links
Nova Scotia Natural Resources Information Circular DNR - 1A: "Guide to buying and measuring stacked firewood"

Customary units of measurement in the United States
Units of volume
Logging